Sarapulka is a rural locality (a village) in Chaykovsky, Perm Krai, Russia. The population was 49 as of 2010. There are 3 streets.

Geography 
Sarapulka is located 42 km southeast of Chaykovsky. Solovyi is the nearest rural locality.

References 

Rural localities in Chaykovsky urban okrug